Super Show 5 is the second world concert tour and fifth international tour by South Korean boy band Super Junior, in support of their sixth studio album, Sexy, Free & Single. The world tour commenced with two shows in Seoul in March 2013 and will continue onto South America, North America and Europe.

This tour marks the return of member Kangin, who was discharged from mandatory military service in April 2012, and the first one since Super Show 2 in 2009. However it is the second tour without Heechul, since Super Show 3, who enlisted in September 2011 and the first without leader Leeteuk, since Super Show 4, who enlisted on 30 October 2012.

Concerts

On day two of the Seoul concerts, the nine members held a press conference at the Olympic Gymnastics Arena. Shindong said "the level of participation on our part was the highest in this concert. Our opinions were actively taken into account from choosing solo and group performances to picking stage costumes". Eunhyuk further explained "We participated in picking songs, organizing stages and choosing costumes", and that their agency took in their opinions. He added that they thought of fans who come to the show every year and decided to perform songs they have not done before. Former SM Entertainment and S.E.S. member Bada made a surprise appearance during Ryeowook's solo stage where he impersonated her.

Yesung announced at the Seoul concert that he will enlist for his mandatory military service in 2013. He enlisted on 6 May, and thus will not take part from the South American leg of the Tour onwards.

The South American leg of the tour marks the group's first exclusive concerts on the continent and the largest by a Korean artist. Super Junior's concert in Chile brought in 12,000 fans, and set a record as the largest audience for a Korean group in South America. Their concert in Brazil was the first independent concert by a Korean group in the country and was the only place that sold out in South America. They wrapped up the South American leg of the concert by performing in front of 40,000 fans overall.

The Super Show 5 concert held in Singapore brought the accumulated number of audience to witness "Super Show" concerts since 2008 to a million.

Super Junior's Super Show 5 held in Mexico on 7 November, sold out tickets in about 5 hours. It set the record of the largest audience for a "Super Show" performed outside of Asia as well as obtaining the record for most attended concert in Latin America for a Korean group, with 15,000 fans attending.

Super Show 5 drew to a very successful end on 22 February 2014, drawing in over 450,000 fans through the whole tour.

Setlist

Tour dates

Personnel 
 Artists:
 Super Junior members: Heechul (From Manila but not London & Mexico), Yesung (Seoul Only), Kangin, Shindong, Sungmin, Eunhyuk, Donghae, Siwon, Ryeowook and Kyuhyun
 Super Junior-M members: Zhou Mi and Henry Lau (Not London and Mexico)
 Tour organizer: SM Entertainment
 Tour promoter: Dream Maker Entercom

Live album

Super Show 5 – Super Junior World Tour Concert Album is Super Junior's fifth live recorded album, released on 6 November 2015. This album contains two CDs with 31 live recordings from the Super Show 5 concerts held on March 23–24, 2013 at the Olympic Gymnastics Arena located in Seoul, South Korea.

Track listing

Media
Super Show 5 - Two reality television documentary on the South America leg of the tour. One was narrated by member Kangin, broadcast on cable channel MBC Music from 13 June 2013, for six weeks. The other was narrated by member Kyuhyun, broadcast on cable channel MBC on 8 June 2013.

References

External links
 Dream Maker Entercom 
 Super Junior official homepage 

2013 concert tours
2014 concert tours
Super Junior concert tours